La locandiera (also known as Mirandolina) is a 1980 Italian comedy film directed by Paolo Cavara, based on the Carlo Goldoni's three-act comedy The Mistress of the Inn.

Plot 
Mirandolina is famed for her beauty and runs an inn. From the outset, the count of Alba Fiorita and the marquis of Forlimpopoli are madly in love with her. The two nobles give her extravagant gifts, trying to impress and marry her. The cunning Mirandolina accepts their money and jewels without giving them her hand. A third man arrives on the scene: the Cavaliere di Ripafratta. He is extremely misogynistic and thinks that women bring only trouble to men.

Mirandolina, who had never encountered a man like this, is deeply offended and takes it upon herself to teach him a lesson. She goes out of her way to make him fall in love with her. She succeeds and leads him to publicly admit in public that he has fallen in love with a woman. As a final punishment for his misogyny, she cruelly rejects him.

In the end, the beautiful Mirandolina realizes she loves Fabrizio, her waiter. She abandons her hobby of "falling in love with men" and decides to remain faithful only to him.

Cast 
 Claudia Mori as Mirandolina 
 Adriano Celentano as Cavaliere di Ripafratta
 Paolo Villaggio as Marchese di Forlimpopoli
 Marco Messeri as Conte di Albafiorita
 Lorenza Guerrieri as  Ortensia
 Gianni Cavina as Fabrizio
 Milena Vukotic as Dejanira
 Camillo Milli as Carlo Goldoni

References

External links

1980 films
Italian comedy films
1980 comedy films
Films directed by Paolo Cavara
Adaptations of works by Carlo Goldoni
1980s Italian-language films
1980s Italian films